Severobaikalsk (Khoito-Baigal, Khoidbaigal) is a town in the Republic of Buryatia, Russia, located on the northern end of Lake Baikal at the mouth of the Tyya River,  northwest of Ulan-Ude and  northeast of Irkutsk. Population:

Geography
Severobaikalsk is located on a plateau at the northern end of Lake Baikal at the mouth of the Tyya River. To the west the town is surrounded by the Baikal Mountains, to the northeast by the Stanovoy Range.

History
The history of Severobaikalsk is closely related to the history of the Baikal-Amur Mainline (BAM). It was founded in 1974 as a work settlement for workers constructing the BAM, serving as a logistics center and a central starting point for the railway project. To the west the railway line was developed to Bratsk and to the east to Tynda. At this time the only settlement in the area was the village Nizhneangarsk, located at the edge of a swampy plain at the northern tip of the lake. Originally it was planned to increase the population to 140,000 people.

The first volunteers of the Komsomol and workers arrived in 1974 and founded a work camp that would later become the town of Severobaikalsk. The camp was initially named Novogodny (lit. New Year) and consisted of tents, wooden shacks and railway cars. The camp grew rapidly with the development of the railway, and Severobaikalsk was eventually granted town status in 1980. During this time until official completion of the railway line in 1984 the town had a partnership with Leningrad. Since completion of the Baikal Amur Mainline the town has been in decline, with many projects cancelled during Perestroika.

Population reached a high with an estimated 35,000 inhabitants in the 1980s and subsequently declined. As the town was founded mostly by volunteers of the Komsomol the population is relatively young. Ninety percent of the population is Russian Orthodox and ten percent are Buryats.

Administrative and municipal status
Within the framework of administrative divisions, it is incorporated as the town of republic significance of Severobaikalsk—an administrative unit with the status equal to that of the districts. As a municipal division, the town of republic significance of Severobaikalsk is incorporated as Severobaikalsk Urban Okrug.

Climate
As a Siberian town, Severobaikalsk experiences a subarctic climate (Dfc), characterized by extreme variation of temperatures between seasons. Temperatures can be very warm in the summer, and brutally cold in the winter.

Cityscape
Like most Soviet-planned cities, the town center is dominated by five to six floor high rise buildings made of prefabricated concrete panels. Because the northern region of Lake Baikal is in a seismically active region the standard design of the high rise buildings has been adapted to ensure greater resistance to earthquakes. The suburbs are dominated by shacks that trace back to the early foundation period when Severobaikalsk was a work camp. Some of these shacks are made of old railway cars.

The main street of Severobaikalsk is Leningradsky Avenue, which starts at the railway station and runs through the central area of the town. The shape of the railway station building is meant to resemble a sail and was designed by architects from Leningrad. In front of the railway station is a monument to volunteers and workers from Leningrad who built the town. North of the railway station, along Leningradsky Avenue is the main square, where the town administration and the Palace of Culture of the railway workers are located. Severobaikalsk also has a church and a museum dedicated to the history of the Baikal Amur Mainline.

Transportation

Severobaikalsk is connected by the Baikal-Amur Mainline to Bratsk and Tayshet in the west and Tynda and Komsomolsk-on-Amur and in the east. In the summer Voskhod hydrofoils connect Severobaikalsk with Irkutsk via Port Baikal.

There is a mountain road to Ul'kan (Авто ВАМ) and Ust-Kut.

References

Notes

Sources

Cities and towns in Buryatia
Cities and towns built in the Soviet Union
Populated places established in 1974
1974 establishments in the Soviet Union
Populated places on Lake Baikal